Mezarkabul (also known as Pentagram in Turkey) is a Turkish metal band formed by Hakan Utangaç and Cenk Ünnü. Mezarkabul is known for integrating Anatolian elements into their music.

History
Mezarkabul was formed in Bursa in 1986 by guitarist Hakan Utangaç and drummer Cenk Ünnü. In 1987, bassist Tarkan Gözübüyük joined, and they started doing live shows. Their first show was performed at a wedding hall at Istanbul, Bağcılar. Tarkan Gozubuyuk could not make it to the concert and instead Ozgunay Unal joined the line up for the concert. By the time they made to their fifth song most of chairs and tables had been destroyed by the audiences. Turkey was meeting metal music and by their crazy emotions this chaoting action happened.Their first songs were  released in 1990 on the self-titled Pentagram album. In 1992, a second guitarist Demir Demirkan joined the band, as well as a new lead singer, Bartu Toptas, helping Hakan to concentrate on his guitar duties. The new line-up played several gigs until Bartu decided to move back to Sweden. He left the band in March 1992 just when they had started to record the Trail Blazer album. The voice in the beginning of "Secret Missile" is Bartu's. To fill Bartu's void, the Mezarkabul members hired vocalist Ogün Sanlısoy. They released their second album Trail Blazer in the same year and enjoyed growing popularity, both in Turkey and across the world. In 1993 guitarist Ümit Yılbar was killed by terrorists on the mountain of Cıraf while he was serving the Turkish army. The remaining members recorded "Fly Forever" in memory of Ümit Yılbar, but the band recorded more songs that dealt with Yılbar's death: "1,000 in the Eastland" and "Anatolia" (both from the album Anatolia).

For the next three years, the band toured in Turkey and other countries. In 1995, vocalist Murat İlkan replaced Ogün, and they started working on their next album, Anatolia, which was released in Turkey in 1997. Several weeks after the release, Century Media approached Mezarkabul for a worldwide release.
The lyrics of Anatolia addressed war, pain and ignorance, often in an unusual way. In "1,000 in the Eastland" the lyrics stress that "thousands of people are dying in the East, all ignored by the West, where one death becomes a tragedy", at the same time emphasizing that "fighting with hatred feeds the rich men". The album has been praised by Sea of Tranquility.

They released a live album in 1997 called Popçular Dışarı. Guitarist Demir Demirkan departed, and was temporarily replaced with Onur "Mr.Cat" Pamukcu.

The band started recording its next album in 2000 in its own studio in Istanbul. Guitarist Metin Türkcan officially joined the band during the recording session. They composed 17 songs, and decided to split it into two different CDs. In 2001, Unspoken was released worldwide.  In 2002, Bir was released in Turkey.

For their releases in Turkey, they use the name "Pentagram". However, due to an American doom metal band called Pentagram, they go by the name "Mezarkabul" for international releases.

Sony Music released in 2008 Mezarkabul's concert album 1987, which includes the band's 20th anniversary concert in Bostancı Gösteri Merkezi on 4 February 2007.

The band celebrated their 25th year with their album MMXII. In 2014 they released their live album "Live MMXII" which consisted of live performances of the band since 2012.

In 2017, past members Demir Demirkan, Ogün Sanlısoy and Murat İlkan rejoined the band for their 30th anniversary release "Akustik" where Turkish musician Şebnem Ferah features as well. They also played live shows as an octet with acoustic instruments, before reverting to electric instruments. The band usually plays live shows as a septet; with Demir only occasionally appearing in live shows, however it has been confirmed on Demir's Instagram page that he will feature on their upcoming album.

With the reunited members, the band released the first single Bu Düzen Yıkılsın on digital music platforms on 30 October 2020 and a video clip of the song was released on YouTube on 1 November 2020.In 29 January "Sur" and 4 June "Pride" called songs released on music and video platforms.

 9th September of 2022 Makina Elektrika that newest album released on music platforms.

Influence on Turkish music
Mezarkabul is often considered to be the pioneers of heavy metal in Turkey. The band's work has inspired all forms of rock music and helped it to gain popularity in Turkey. They were known to collaborate with the late vocalist of Vitamin, Gökhan Semiz, and Vitamin itself. Also, Tarkan Gözübüyük has produced, arranged and performed with numerous artists and bands. Early examples of his work as a contributing artist includes Şebnem Ferah's debut album titled Kadın which was a success in Turkey. Later on in 2005, Gözübüyük produced Ferah's album titled Can Kırıkları. Another example, Mor ve Ötesi's groundbreaking album Dünya Yalan Söylüyor was produced by Gözübüyük. In addition to contributions to rock music, Mezarkabul members have contributed to popular music as well. Demir Demirkan, as he pursued his solo career, wrote the lyrics and produced the first Turkish song ever to win the Eurovision song contest. Tuna Kiremitçi, of the Vatan newspaper, wrote an article about the band, praising their contributions.

Members

Current members
Hakan Utangaç - rhythm guitar, vocals, (1986–present)
Cenk Ünnü - drums (1986–present)
Tarkan Gözübüyük - bass guitar, backing vocals (1987–present)
Demir Demirkan - Lead guitar (1990–1992),(1996-1998),(2017-present)
Ogün Sanlısoy - lead vocals (1992–1995),(2017–present)
Metin Türkcan - lead guitar, backing vocals (1992-1996),(2000–present)
Murat İlkan - lead vocals (1995–2010),(2017–present)
Gökalp Ergen -  lead vocals (2010–present), occasional acoustic guitar (2017–present)

Former members
 Engin Tümer- Lead  guitar (1987)
 Ümit Yılbar - Lead guitar (1988–1989)
 Burak Kalaycı Lead guitar (1989)
 Murat Net - Lead guitar (1989–1990)
Bartu Toptas - lead vocals (1990–1992)
İhsan Sen - Lead guitar (1992-1993)
 Onur "Mr.Cat" Pamukcu - guitar (1998–2000)

Timeline

Discography

Albums
1990 - Pentagram
1992 - Trail Blazer
1997 - Anatolia
2001 - Unspoken
2002 - Bir
2012 - MMXII 
2017 - Akustik
2022 - Makina Elektrika - Sony Music

Live album
1997 - Popçular Dışarı. Includes tracks:
 Intro (Omen II)
 Before the Veil
 Behind the Veil
 Welcome the End
 No One Wins the Fight
 G.S.T.K.P.
 Vita es Morte
 Gündüz Gece
 Black Magic
 Rotten Dogs
 999
 1000 in the Eastland
 Anatolia
2008 - Pentagram 1987. Includes tracks:
	Gordions Knot		 
	In Esîr like an Eagle		 
	Unspoken		 
	Seytan Bunun Neresinde		 
	No One Wins the Fight		 
	This Too Will Pass		 
	1000 in the Eastland		 
	For the One Unchanging		 
	Vita Es Morte		 
	Anatolia		 
	Powerstage		 
	Rotten Dogs		 
	Bu Alemi Gören Sensin		 
	Dark Is the Sunlight		 
	Take My Time		 
	Ölümlü		 
	G.S.T.K.P.		 
	Secret Missile		 
	Tigris		 
	Bir		 
	Lions in a Cage		 
	Behind the Veil		 
	Gündüz Gece		 
	For Those Who Died Alone		
2014 - Live MMXIV. Includes tracks:
Disc 1 (CD)
 Sand	06:00	 
 Nevermore	06:10	 
 Geçmişin Yükü	05:05	 
 Beyond Insanity	04:18	 
 Doğmadan Önce	05:05	 
 Wasteland	05:49	 
 Dawn Again	04:33	 
 Disturbing the Peace	04:07	 
 Uzakta	04:46	 
 Apokalips	06:47	 
52:40	 
Disc 2 (DVD)
 1000 in the Eastland	04:28	 
 Şeytan Bunun Neresinde	03:26	 
 Give Me The Something To Kill The Pain	04:12	 
 Wasteland	05:32	 
 Gündüz Gece	04:12	 
 Lions in a Cage	05:13	 
 Geçmişin Yükü	04:53	 
 Tigris / Bir	05:08	 
 Uzakta	04:46	 
 Vita Es Morte	04:58	 
 Wasteland	05:59	 
 Sand	05:56	 
 Beyond Insanity	04:16	 
 Tigris / Bir	05:26	 
 Give Me The Something To Kill The Pain	04:38	 
 Geçmişin Yükü	05:17	 
 Unspoken	06:23	 
 1000 in the Eastland	05:02	 
 Wasteland	05:32	 
 Disturbing the Peace	04:13	 
 Sand	04:52	 
 Beyond Insanity	04:18	 
 Tigris / Bir	05:41	 
 Geçmişin Yükü (Videoclip)	05:08	 
 Apokalips (Videoclip)	06:24	 
02:05:53

Demo
1991 - Live at the Trail

DVD
2008 - Pentagram 1987

External links
 Official Mezarkabul website

References

Turkish heavy metal musical groups
Power metal musical groups
Musical groups established in 1986
1986 establishments in Turkey
Century Media Records artists
Nuclear Blast artists
Sanctuary Records artists
Noise Records artists